The 1955 Western Kentucky Hilltoppers football team represented Western Kentucky State College (now known as Western Kentucky University) as a member of the Ohio Valley Conference (OVC) during the 1955 college football season. Led by eighth-year head coach Jack Clayton, the Hilltoppers compiled an overall record of 3–6 with a mark of 1–4 in conference play, placing fifth in the OVC. The team's captains were Jerry Nassano and Vernon "Tank" Wilson.

Schedule

References

Western Kentucky
Western Kentucky Hilltoppers football seasons
Western Kentucky Hilltoppers football